Qaleh-ye Mohammad Aqa (also Romanized as Qal‘eh-ye Moḩammad Āqā; also known as Kalāteh-ye Moḩammad Āqā) is a village in Kharqan Rural District, Bastam District, Shahrud County, Semnan Province, Iran. At the 2006 census, its population was 182, in 51 families.

References 

Populated places in Shahrud County